Inana is a village in Rajasthan, India.

Inana may also refer to:

 Blastobasis inana, a species of moth of the family Blastobasidae
 Acleris inana, a species of moth of the family Tortricidae

See also 
 Inanna (disambiguation)